Fanny is a 1961 American Technicolor romantic drama film directed by Joshua Logan. The screenplay by Julius J. Epstein is based on the book for the 1954 stage musical of the same title by Logan and S.N. Behrman, which in turn had been adapted from Marcel Pagnol's trilogy. Pagnol wrote two plays, Marius (1929) and Fanny (1931) and completed the cycle by writing and directing a film, César, in 1936. Meanwhile, Marius (1931) and Fanny (1932) were also produced as films.

The film deleted all the songs from Fanny, the stage musical, but the music by Harold Rome served as the underscore for the soundtrack, and the title tune is used as the Main Title theme. It was nominated for both the Academy Award and the Golden Globe Award for Best Original Score.

Plot
César (Charles Boyer) is a barkeeper in Marseille in the early 1920s. His 18-year-old son Marius (Horst Buchholz) works for him at his bar, but wants nothing more than to go to sea and leave his boring existence behind. The only thing holding him back is Fanny (Leslie Caron), an 18-year-old girl with whom he grew up. Fanny works selling fish with her mother down at the waterfront. Fanny has been in love with Marius her whole life. She flirts with him, but Marius always rejects her.

Fanny invites Marius to a Sunday-night dance, but he rejects her once more. Unbeknownst to Fanny, Marius is planning to leave the next day. Encouraged by his friend, the “Admiral” (Raymond Bussieres), he has secretly signed on as a sailor on a round-the-world scientific expedition. Offended, Fanny leaves.

Meanwhile, elderly merchant Panisse (Maurice Chevalier) asks to meet with Fanny's mother Honorine (Georgette Anys), who believes he wants to propose to her. To Honorine's surprise, Panisses wants to marry Fanny, even though he knows she loves someone else. Although disappointed, Honorine does not object: Panisse is worth 600,000 francs.

Fanny tells Marius that she has rejected Panisse's proposal because she loves him and is willing to wait until he returns. Marius tells her he will be away for five years and to forget about him. They declare their love for each other and go to Fanny's house, where they are alone.

The following morning, Honorine discovers Fanny and Marius in bed together. She and César begin to plan their children's wedding, but Fanny urges Marius to leave. She even lies to him, telling him that she would rather marry a rich man like Panisse than him. But, in truth, she is afraid that, eventually, he will grow to hate her for depriving him of this great opportunity.

About two months after Marius goes off to sea, Fanny discovers that she is pregnant with his child. She tells Panisse, who is happy to marry her anyway, overjoyed by the possibility of a male heir to carry on his name. They marry, and Fanny gives birth to a boy. César, knowing the baby's true father, collaborates with Panisse to give the baby the name Césario Marius Panisse.

On Césario's first birthday, Panisse takes the train to Paris on business. While he is gone, Marius returns, on a short leave. He visits Fanny, and upon learning her child is his, apologizes to Fanny.  He knows now that she said those things only to make him go. Marius tells her that he wants her back, but César comes in before anything can happen. Panisse arrives home early. Knowing that Fanny will not leave without the boy, he says that he will not try to stop Fanny from going with Marius, but he will not part with the child. Fanny tells Marius she loves him, but she will not take Césario from Panisse. Marius leaves without Fanny or his child.

Ten years later, Césario (Joel Flateau) is looking forward to his birthday party. After being taken to the waterfront, Césario wanders off and meets the Admiral. The Admiral takes the boy sailing without telling anyone and reunites him with Marius, though Césario has no idea who Marius is. Marius, who is now working in a garage, is overjoyed to see his son, but when Panisse is told the boy is missing, he is stricken and taken to his room. Fanny is shocked to find Césario with his father. She announces that Panisse is dying, and Marius drives them home.

When they arrive at the house, Panisse calls for Césario to sit with him. Fanny goes outside and talks with Cesar and Marius. Marius expresses his bitterness and announces his plans to leave for the United States the next day. Fanny explains to Marius that she never told him about the baby because on the day he left, she hoped he would turn around and not get on the boat. When he did not, she felt betrayed and angry. Fanny goes to Panisse. On his deathbed, Panisse dictates a letter asking Marius to marry Fanny and be a father to Césario. His only request is that the boy keep the last name, Panisse.

Cast

Production
Several versions of the Pagnol works had been filmed prior to this adaptation. The original film trilogy in French was directed by Alexander Korda (Marius, 1931), Marc Allégret (Fanny, 1932) and Pagnol himself (César, 1936). There was a 1933 Italian film named Fanny, the 1934 German film Der Schwarze Walfisch ("The Black Whale"), and Port of Seven Seas, a 1938 American film directed by James Whale, also based on the trilogy.

Jack L. Warner purchased the screen rights to the stage musical, but believing that the popularity of musical films was on the wane, he decided to eliminate the songs. West Side Story, released the same year as Fanny, proved to be a box office success. The production did benefit significantly from the decision: Charles Boyer, who had refused the role when it involved singing because he would neither sing nor allow his voice to be dubbed, gladly accepted when that was no longer necessary. Boyer and Chevalier, who were old friends, were delighted to be able to work together, at last.

Before the picture's release, art house theater owners booked the original films, promoting the showings as the last opportunity to see them before the new picture came out. In fact, Warner's acquisition of the screen rights removed the films from circulation for decades.

Plans for the original title, Joshua Logan's Fanny, were scrapped when reporters pointed out the double meaning.

Screenwriter Julius J. Epstein had collaborated with Joshua Logan on Tall Story the previous year, but he initially declined the director's offer to adapt Fanny for the screen, because he found it difficult to believe Marius' motivation for leaving Marseille. He accepted the assignment after Logan found a solution in Marius' relationship with his father. Epstein relied on Pagnol's plays for inspiration, but retained the ending of the musical, which was quite different from the plot of Pagnol's original film, César. Some scenes and dialogue are taken directly from the 1938 film.

Prior to Warner's decision to film the property as a straight drama, Logan had offered Charles Boyer the role of César but the actor declined because he felt he could not sing and was unwilling to lip sync to someone else's voice. When the songs were dropped, he accepted the offer. He and Maurice Chevalier, cast as Panisse, were old friends but had never performed together. Both welcomed the opportunity to do so.

Audrey Hepburn agreed to portray Fanny but eventually had to decline the role due to prior commitments. Assuming the French would dislike an English language interpretation of the Pagnol plays, Leslie Caron was hesitant to replace her, but she liked the script and accepted three weeks before principal photography began.

Among the Marseille locations used for filming were Notre-Dame de la Garde and Vieux Port.

Reception

Critical reception
Bosley Crowther of The New York Times observed, "Whether fan of the Pagnol films or stage show, whether partial to music or no, you can't help but derive joy from this picture if you have a sense of humor and a heart. For Mr. Logan, with the aid of expert craftsmen and a cast of principals that we do not believe an act of divine cooperation could have greatly improved upon, has given the charming Marseilles folk play a stunning pictorial sweep, a deliciously atmospheric flavor and a flesh-touching intimacy. And, embraced by these graphic, sensuous virtues are the rich human, comic elements that flowed out of Pagnol's little pictures and glimmered upon the Broadway stage . . . To be sure, there are flaws in the compound. The cutting is often too abrupt, some scenes are confused by intercutting, and the tempo in the early phases is much too fast. Also, occasionally the actors are costumed too prettily, and the domestic magnificence of the Panisses in the last part is tasteless and absurd . . . [But] on the whole, the appropriate atmosphere of Marseilles is literally and colorfully conveyed — in excellent color, by the way. Perhaps there will be some prim objection to the lush emotionalism of it all and to the frankness of the musical nudging, but we loved it."

Box office
Fanny was the highest-grossing film at Radio City Music Hall in New York City at the time, grossing $1,573,582 in nine weeks and was number one at the US box office for three weeks.

Awards and nominations

Home media
Warner Home Video released the film on video on February 9, 1983 as part of their "A Night At the Movies" series, featuring a Hearst Metrotone Newsreel; a Warner Bros. animated short; and a coming attractions trailer of films from 1961. Image Entertainment released the film on DVD on June 17, 2008.

See also
 List of American films of 1961
 Fanny, the 1932 original film version

References

External links

 
 
 
 
 

1961 films
1960s English-language films
1960s pregnancy films
1961 romantic drama films
American films based on plays
American pregnancy films
American remakes of French films
American romantic drama films
Films based on adaptations
Films based on musicals based on films
Films based on works by Marcel Pagnol
Films directed by Joshua Logan
Films scored by Harry Sukman
Films scored by Morris Stoloff
Films set in the 1920s
Films set in Marseille
Films shot in Marseille
Warner Bros. films
1960s American films